The 2014 Men's World Junior Team Squash Championships was held in Windhoek, Namibia. The event took place from 16 to 21 August 2014.

Seeds

Group stage results

Pool A

Pool B

Pool C

Pool D

Pool E

Pool F

Finals

Draw

Results

Semi-finals

Final

Post-tournament team ranking

See also
2014 Men's World Junior Squash Championships
World Junior Squash Championships

References

External links 
World Junior Squash Championships 2014 Official Website

Sport in Windhoek
World Junior Squash Championships
Wor
Squash 
Men's World Junior Team Squash Championships
Squash tournaments in Namibia
International sports competitions hosted by Namibia
21st century in Windhoek